Donald Paterson Turnbull (28 May 1909 – 30 January 1994) was a professional tennis player from Australia. He won the men's doubles title at the Australian Championships twice, in 1936 and 1937. Turnbull represented Australia in three Davis Cup ties, including the 1933 Europe Zone final against Great Britain. Turnbull beat defending champion Edgar Moon at the 1931 Australian Championships. Turnbull's forehand was in fine form and Moon made the mistake of not targeting Turnbull's weaker backhand. Turnbull came from 2–0 down in the fifth set to win. Turnbull lost in the semifinals to Jack Crawford in straight sets.

Grand Slam finals

Doubles (2 titles, 3 runner-ups)

Mixed doubles (1 runner-up)

References

External links
 

1909 births
Australian male tennis players
Tennis people from South Australia
Australian Championships (tennis) champions
Australian Championships (tennis) junior champions
Grand Slam (tennis) champions in men's doubles
1994 deaths
Grand Slam (tennis) champions in boys' singles
Grand Slam (tennis) champions in boys' doubles
20th-century Australian people